Cyclone Warehouse was a venue for Underground art located in the Butcher Town area of San Francisco, California, between Potrero Hill and Hunter's Point.  It was known for hosting eclectic events, and formerly served as headquarters to a loose collective of artists and artisans.

The space was founded in 1992 by Troy Shelton, Nicolas Desbons, Todd Martinez, Dan Hersey, Mark Reitman, Jason Price and Geordie Stevens, a group of students from CCAC and SFSU.  They built the space primarily from found materials.

Neighbors
The space was one of 15 bays in a larger warehouse - a mix of artists studios and small business workshops. Some of those neighbors have been "The Cave" (a rock venue in the 1990s run by Beky Bonk), Phase (seminal noise venue), Seemen (robotics artist), Ovarian Trolley (on Candy Ass Records), Who's on Third Studios, The Lodge, and Bay Area Metals (recycling center).

Hosted artists
Cyclone Warehouse hosted a long list of memorable events. Punk shows, industrial art, house/techno parties, dance performance, theater productions, circus, cabaret, and puppets were all part of the repertoire:

T.V. Homicide
Survival Research Laboratories
Cyclecide Bike Rodeo 
Mia Zapata Benefit
Big Top 23
Captain Ricks Cabaret
Seven Year Bitch
Victims Family
Steel Pole Bath Tub
Woodpussy
Idiot Flesh
Hickey
All You Can Eat
Shellac 
Seemen
Neurosis
Ovarian Trolley
The Chasm of Spasms
The Islais Creek Fair
Cookie Mongoloid

References
Wisner, Heather. "Night & Day", SF Weekly. May 19, 1999.  Accessed May 15, 2007.
Tudor, Silke. "Night Crawler", SF Weekly.  March 1999.  Accessed May 15, 2007.
Anonymous. "Berkeley Blog" Mention of the Shellac show on the CSUA blog. Accessed May 15, 2007.
Spelletich, Kalman. "1999 SEEMEN Performances", seemen.org. Accessed May 15, 2007.

1992 establishments in California